Chimères (pour Ondes Martenot) is the third solo album of Christine Ott. Chimères (pour Ondes Martenot) was entirely conceived using only Ott's Ondes Martenot. The album was produced by Paul Régimbeau (Mondkopf) and Frederic D Oberland (Oiseaux-Tempête), who arranged the tracks with the composer by manipulating the sounds of the Ondes Martenot via live effect boxes and sonic manipulation. The album opens with the piece "Comma", which has been compared to Olivier Messiaen's work, and the album develops eight pieces from contemporary classical to electronic music and avant-garde music, also compared to Sergei Prokofiev and Daniel Lopatin.

Track listing
 "Comma" – 6:12
 "Darkstar" – 5:06
 "Todeslied" – 8:52
 "Mariposas" – 3:38
 "Sirius" – 5:51
 "Pulsar" – 2:28
 "Eclipse" – 8:11
 "Burning" – 6:46

References

2020 albums
Christine Ott albums